The 12239 / 12240 Mumbai Central–Hisar Duronto Express is a Duronto Express train of the Indian Railways connecting  (MMCT) to  (HSR) .It is currently being operated with 12239 / 12240 train numbers.

Coach composition

The rake has 8 AC 3 tier coaches, 2 AC 2 tier coaches, 1 AC First Class, 1 Pantry car and 2 EOG cars making a total of 14 coaches.

As is customary with Indian Railways, coaches are added/removed as per the demand.

Service

It is the fastest train on the Mumbai–Jaipur sector. It averages 75.59 km/hr as 12239 Duronto Express covering 1159 km in 15 hrs 20 mins & 70.24 km/hr as 12240 Duronto Express covering 1159 km in 16 hrs 30 mins.

Some of the other trains that cover the Mumbai–Jaipur sectors are 12955/56 Jaipur Superfast Express, 12979/80 Jaipur–Bandra Terminus Superfast Express, 19707/08 Amrapur Aravali Express, 22933/34 Bandra Terminus–Jaipur Weekly Superfast Express, 12215/16 Delhi Sarai Rohilla–Bandra Terminus Garib Rath Express which initially ran up to Jaipur, later extended to Delhi Sarai Rohilla.

Train details

This train had its inaugural run on 3 April 2011. It was & still is a 2 days a week service. It is a fully AC train & uses LHB rakes. Until 17th August, 2021, it used to ply between Mumbai Central and Jaipur Junction but then, it was extended upto Hisar Junction railway station.

Commercial halts

 is a technical halt only when it operates as 12239 Jaipur Duronto Express.

 is where it reverses direction of travel.

The train is hauled by a diesel locomotive till , from where it changes to electric locomotive.

Time Table

 12239 Mumbai Central–Jaipur Duronto Express leaves Mumbai Central every Tuesday & Sunday and reaches Hisar Junction the next day.
 12240 Jaipur–Mumbai Central Duronto Express leaves Hisar Junction every Tuesday & Thursday and reaches Mumbai Central the next day.

See also
Duronto Express
Mumbai Central railway station
Jaipur Junction railway station
Jaipur Superfast Express

References

External links

Transport in Jaipur
Transport in Mumbai
Rail transport in Maharashtra
Rail transport in Madhya Pradesh
Duronto Express trains
Rail transport in Rajasthan
Railway services introduced in 2011